"Nervous" is a rockabilly/doo-wop song first recorded by Gene Summers and His Rebels in 1958 and later covered by Robert Gordon and Link Wray, among others. It was composed by Mary Tarver in 1957, published by Ted Music, BMI  and issued  on Jan/Jane Records. The "Nervous" recording session took place at Liberty Records Studios in Hollywood, California in June 1958 and featured Rene Hall and James McClung on guitar, Plas Johnson on saxophone, Earl Palmer on drums, and George "Red" Callendar on bass. The background vocal group was the Five Masks (Al "TNT" Braggs, Cal Valentine, Robert Valentine, Billy Fred Thomas and Jesse Lee Floyd). The flipside of "Nervous" was "Gotta Lotta That".

Reviews

BILLBOARD MAGAZINE - June 1958 Reviews of New Pop Records 
GENE SUMMERS
Nervous....83
JAN 102 - Strong material and strong performance by the new talent. It's a powerful beat job and the kids should flip over it. Action already reported from the southwest territories. (Ted, BMI)

The Cash Box - The Cash Box Best Bets - June 14, 1958 "NERVOUS" (2:22) [Ted, BMI - Tarver]Gene Summers & His Rebels (January 102)"...exciting opus...could spread like wildfire...strong merchandise..."

"Nervous" cover versions

Johnny Devlin - New Zealand
Lonstars - Finland
Rock-Ola & The Freewheelers - Finland
Robert Gordon - United States
Robert Gordon with Link Wray - United States

References

Gene Summers discography from Rocky Productions, France
Gene Summers discography from Wangdangdula Finland
Gene Summers session data from Tapio's Fin-A-Billy, Finland

Sources
Billboard Magazine - June 1958 Reviews of New Pop Records United States
The Cash Box - June 1958 The Cash Box Best Bets United States
Liner notes "The Ultimate School Of Rock & Roll" 1997 United States
Johnny Devlin, "Hit Tunes" EP Boutique/Coca-Cola Records C-1001 Australia, 1959
Lonestars, "Bop & Roll" CD Jungle Records 3003 Finland, 1981
Rock -Ola and the Freewheelers, "Upskirt" CD Bluelight Records BLR-3374 2 Finland, 2000
Robert Gordon, "Bad Boy" LP/CD RCA Records AFLI 3523 United States, 1979
Robert Gordon with Link Wray, "Fresh Fish Special" CD Raven Records RVCD 57 Australia, 1997
"Cover Versions Of The Songs Made Famous By Gene Summers" 2007  United States
Article and sessionography in issue 15 (1977) of New Kommotion Magazine UK
Article and sessionography in issue 23 (1980) of New Kommotion Magazine UK
Feature article and sessionography in issue 74 (1999) of Rockin' 1950s Magazine Germany
Feature article with photo spread in issue 53 (2000) of Bill Griggs' Rockin' 1950s Magazine United States
Feature Article with photo spread in issue 54 (2000) of Bill Griggs' Rockin' 1950s Magazine United States

See also
Rockin' Country Style

1958 singles
Gene Summers songs
1957 songs
Songs written by Mary Tarver
Jubilee Records singles